The Free Egyptians Party is an Egyptian liberal party, founded after the 2011 Egyptian revolution. It supports the principles of a liberal, democratic, and secular political order in Egypt. The Free Egyptians Party was the largest party in the House of Representatives.
The party is a founding member of Al Hurriya Liberal Network.

History

Establishment
On 3 April 2011, the engineer and businessman Naguib Sawiris, and a group of intellectuals and political activists announced the establishment of the party and declared the program, the objectives and the basic principles of the party. Other prominent party members include the Egyptian American scientist Farouk El-Baz, the Egyptian Arabic poet Ahmed Fouad Negm, the writer Gamal El-Ghitani, and the telecommunications entrepreneur Khaled Bichara.

In July 2011, infighting emerged within the party. An internal faction called the "Group of 17" accused the national leadership of undemocratic methods in choosing local leaders in the Damietta Governorate and of tolerating former members of the National Democratic Party, the ruling party of the toppled Mubarak regime, within the ranks of the Free Egyptians Party. Five of the dissidents have been excluded from the party, and have been denoted as "troublemakers" by party officials. Nevertheless, in August of the same year, the new party reported to have 100,000 members.

Egyptian Bloc and elections of 2011/2012
The Free Egyptians Party was an integral component of the Egyptian Bloc, a broad electoral alliance opposing the Muslim Brotherhood, founded on 16 August 2011. The Egyptian Bloc has taken up the cause of defending Egypt's secularity and civic society. However, until the first post-revolutionary parliamentary elections, held in November 2011 and January 2012, several member parties left the Egyptian Bloc, complaining that it included "remnants of the former regime".

So, at the time of the election the Bloc only included the Free Egyptians Party, the Egyptian Social Democratic Party (ESDP), and Tagammu. Together, the Bloc won 2,402,238 votes, corresponding to a share of 8.9%. Of the 332 seats allocated to parties and coalitions, 33 were taken by candidates of the Egyptian Bloc, 14 of which were members of the Free Egyptians Party. One FEP member was elected to one of the 166 seats reserved for individual candidates.

Unlike its partners ESDP and Tagammu, the Free Egyptians Party decided to boycott the Shura council elections in January and February 2012, citing the reluctance of authorities to address irregularities during the lower house elections. After the elections, the Egyptian Bloc collapsed with the ESDP retiring, claiming that the other partners were more concerned over the secular-Islamist divide than over the differences between the former regime and the forces of the revolution. In March 2012, former deputy chairman and member of parliament Mohamed Abu Hamed resigned from the party to become a leader of the Life of the Egyptians Party and later of the Egyptian Patriotic Movement.

Opposition against the Islamist government
The Free Egyptians did not take part in the selection of members of the Constituent Assembly in June 2012, lamenting an over-representation of Islamists in it. It confirmed its calls to boycott the assembly in September 2012. Instead, the FEP participated in a number of projects trying to coordinate the secular opposition against the Islamist majority that came out of the election, namely the Egyptian Nation Alliance that was announced in September 2012, the Civil Democratic Movement of October 2012, and the National Salvation Front founded in November 2012. The FEP called for a boycott of the constitutional referendum in December 2012 to demonstrate their rejection of the entire process that led to the Islamist-sponsored 2012 constitution.

After 2013 protests
The Free Egyptians Party supported the ouster of President Mohamed Morsi, which followed anti-government protests against him. The party regarded the protests leading up to Morsi's removal as a revolution and did not regard his overthrow as a coup.
In December 2013, the older liberal Democratic Front Party merged into the Free Egyptians Party. In the same month, it was reported that the Free Egyptians Party had become part of the National Front Coalition, but in February 2014 the party clarified that it would not make sense to join an electoral alliance before the electoral law was even passed.

The Free Egyptians supported the 2014 Egyptian constitution that was up for vote during the January 2014 constitutional referendum, which it passed with 98.1% (while the turnout was 38.6%). In April 2014, the Free Egyptians Party was admitted as a full member to the Liberal International, as it had previously already been an observer member and member of the regional Arab Alliance for Freedom and Democracy. The party declared its support for candidate Abdel Fattah el-Sisi in the May 2014 presidential election.

President
After the party's establishment, a presidential office was established to act as president of the party until internal elections.. After the parliamentary elections of November 2011 and January 2012, Ahmed Said was appointed as interim president of the party and Rawi Camel-Touge as interim Secretary General. After holding the first congress of the party on 10 May 2013 Ahmed Said was elected as the first elected president of the Free Egyptians Party. After the merger of the Democratic Front Party into the Free Egyptians Party, at the first Supreme Council meeting on 28 April 2014 Essam Khalil was elected to be General Secretary.

in December 2015, Free Egyptians Party elected his leader Essam Khalil with 84% of votes to be the second elected president.

Political bureau
The first elected Political Bureau of the Free Egyptians Party:
 Essam Khalil – Party Leader
 Nader El Sharkawy; (Acting Secretary General)
 Alaa Abed – Parliamentary Bloc Chief
 Belal Habash
 Shehab Wagieh
 Mona Gab Allah
 Ahmed Saif – Managing Director
 Manal Abdel-Hamid
 Nassr El Kafas
 Amir Youssef

Board of Trustees
Board of trustees was approved in the first congress of the party
 Salah Fadel – Chairman
 Naguib Sawiris
 Mohammed Salmawy
 Farouk El-Baz
 Yehia El-Gamal
 Sakina Fouad 
 Nadim Elias 
 Ragy Soliman
 Mahmoud Al Alily

Internal Crisis
In 2016, the Free Egyptians Party underwent a major internal crisis that led to the division of the party into two opposing factions; one led by Party Leader Essam Khalil, and the other led by Party founder Naguib Sawiris.

Buildup
Essam Khalil saw Sawiris and the Board as being too domineering over party affairs, and that the only way to effectively lead what was now the biggest political party in Egypt would be to remove the board and transfer the executive and legislative roles of the board to the Political Bureau.

Furthermore, Khalil was angered by Sawiris' constant interference in party affairs and his criticism of the party's continued support for the government. Sawiris also called for disciplinary action against several party members, for voting in favour of actions he deemed wrong, such as the attack on the influential Egyptian writer and media personality Ibrahim Eissa. The majority of said parliamentarians were close friends of Khalil's, which caused further tension between the two.

It has also been reported that Sawiris had cut off funding towards the party for 6–7 months in protest of its policies. Sawiris wanted the party to serve as an opposition figure to the government, whereas it seemed Khalil was just supporting everything the government did.

Division
The dispute began when Khalil called for a vote to dissolve the Board of Trustees of the party at the Annual Party Conference. Khalil emphasised that the party was too big for a Board of Trustees, and that the system of management of the party was too inefficient. He asserted that there are only two other parties in the world with a Board of Trustees, one in Iran, and the other being the Muslim Brotherhood. However, according to the party's own bylaws, any decision concerning the governance of the party must be approved of by the Board of Trustees.

Thus a stalemate was reached, wherein Khalil took control of the party as though the Board had approved the new proposals, whilst Sawiris stood firm in his stance against the move, deeming it to be illegal, and continues to exercise great influence on the party.

Aftermath
Little has changed in the party's situation since 2016. Sawiris has since filed a lawsuit in Egypt against Essam Khalil for violation of the party's internal bylaws. However, due to the inactivity of the party, especially in the face of the growing influence of the Wafd Party and the explosive rise of the Future of the Nation Party, the Free Egyptians Party is no longer seen as the political force it once was, and is widely expected to lose many seats in the next parliamentary elections.

Election results

References

External links

2011 establishments in Egypt
Egyptian nationalist parties
Liberal parties in Egypt
Organisations of the Egyptian Crisis (2011–2014)
Political parties established in 2011
Secularism in Egypt